The 1971–72 FA Cup was the 91st season of the world's oldest football cup competition, the Football Association Challenge Cup, commonly known as the FA Cup. Leeds United won the competition for the first time, beating holders Arsenal 1–0 in the final at Wembley, London.

Several records were set during this FA Cup season. This was the third year in which the losing semi-finalists were required to compete in a "match for third place"; following a goalless 90 minutes, Birmingham City beat Stoke City in a penalty shootout, the first time this method had been used to determine the result of an FA Cup match.

In the first round proper, Ted MacDougall's nine goals for A.F.C. Bournemouth as they beat Margate 11–0 remains the record for goals scored in a match in the FA Cup proper.
The fourth qualifying round tie between Alvechurch and Oxford City became the longest FA Cup tie ever, lasting a total of eleven hours before Alvechurch won the fifth replay 1–0.

Matches were scheduled to be played at the stadium of the team named first on the date specified for each round, which was always a Saturday. If scores were level after 90 minutes had been played, a replay would take place at the stadium of the second-named team later the same week. If the replayed match was drawn further replays would be held until a winner was determined. If scores were level after 90 minutes had been played in a replay, a 30-minute period of extra time would be played.

Calendar

Results

First round proper

At this stage clubs from the Football League Third and Fourth Divisions joined 28 non-league clubs having come through the qualifying rounds. To complete this round Telford United, Hillingdon Borough, Skelmersdale United and Dagenham were given byes as finalists of FA Trophy and FA Amateur Cup of the last season. Matches were scheduled to be played on Saturday, 20 November 1971, although Aldershot's tie with Alvechurch was delayed until 24 November because non-league clubs Alvechurch and Oxford City were taking part in the longest FA Cup tie on record, the fifth and decisive replay taking place on 22 November, two days after the date set for the first round ties. Nine drawn matches were settled by a single replay. Ted MacDougall set a goalscoring record for the FA Cup proper with nine goals for Third Division A.F.C. Bournemouth as they beat Margate of the Southern League 11–0.

Second round proper
The matches were scheduled for Saturday, 11 December 1971. Six matches were drawn, one of which required a second replay.

Third round proper
The 44 First and Second Division clubs entered the competition at this stage. The matches were scheduled for Saturday, 15 January 1972; the tie between Newcastle United and Hereford United at Newcastle was twice postponed because of a waterlogged pitch on which snow had fallen. Ten matches were drawn, each of which was settled by a single replay. The replay between Hereford and Newcastle, also the subject of several postponements and eventually played on the day scheduled for the fourth round ties, was voted "best FA Cup tie ever" in a 2007 poll hosted in The Observer newspaper.

Fourth round proper
The matches were scheduled for Saturday, 5 February 1972; Hereford United, unable to play their third-round replay until this date, played their match later that week. Five matches were drawn, of which one required a second replay.

Fifth round proper
The matches were played on Saturday, 26 February 1972. Two matches were drawn, of which one required a second replay.

Sixth round proper

Replay

Semi-finals 

Replay

Match for third place
For the third time in what turned out to be a five-year experiment, the losing semifinalists were obliged to play off for third and fourth place. The match was held over until immediately before the 1972–73 season. After a goalless 90 minutes, the result was determined by a penalty shootout, the first time this method was used to settle a match in the FA Cup.

Final

The final took place on Saturday, 6 May 1972 at Wembley and ended in a victory for Leeds United over Arsenal by 1–0. The goal was scored by Allan Clarke. The attendance was 100,000.

TV coverage
The rights to show FA Cup games were, as with Football League matches, shared between the BBC and ITV network. All games were shown in a highlights format, except the Final, which was shown live both on BBC1 & ITV. The BBC football highlights programme Match Of The Day would show up to three games and the various ITV regional network stations would cover up to one game and show highlights from other games covered elsewhere on the ITV network. No games from Rounds 1 or 2 were shown. Highlights of replays would be shown on either the BBC or ITV. Third round BBC Swindon Town v Arsenal, Wolverhampton Wanderers v Leicester City, Blackpool v Chelsea, Manchester United v Southampton (Midweek-replay), Hereford United v Newcastle United (Saturday-replay) ITV Southampton v Manchester United (Southern & Granada), West Ham United v Luton Town (LWT), Leeds United v Bristol Rovers (Yorkshire), Peterborough United v Ipswich Town (Anglia), Derby County v Shrewsbury (ATV), Sunderland v Sheffield Wednesday (Tyne-Tees). Fourth round BBC Liverpool v Leeds United, Preston North End v Manchester United ITV Reading v Arsenal (Southern & LWT), Birmingham City v Ipswich Town (ATV), Huddersfield Town v Fulham (Yorkshire), Everton v Walsall (Granada), Coventry City v Hull City (Anglia-covered game out of region), Leeds United v Liverpool (Midweek replay-All regions). Fifth round BBC Orient v Chelsea, Cardiff City v Leeds United, Manchester United v Middlesbrough, Middlesbrough v Manchester United (Midweek-replay) ITV Everton v Tottenham Hotspur (Granada & LWT), Birmingham City v Portsmouth (ATV), Huddersfield Town v West Ham United, Stoke City v Hull City (Anglia-covered game out of region). Sixth round BBC Leeds United v Tottenham Hotspur, Manchester United v Stoke City ITV Orient v Arsenal (LWT), Birmingham City v Huddersfield Town  (ATV & Yorkshire) All regions covered those two games. Semi-final BBC Birmingham City v Leeds United ITV Arsenal v Stoke City All regions covered this game Arsenal v Stoke City (Midweek Replay All Regions) Final Arsenal v Leeds United Shown Live on both BBC & all ITV regions

Notes
A. : Match played at Gigg Lane, Bury.
B. : Match played at The Hawthorns, West Bromwich.
C. : Match played at Maine Road, Manchester.
D. : Match played at Filbert Street, Leicester.

References
General
The FA Cup Archive at TheFA.com
English FA Cup 1971/72 at Soccerbase
F.A. Cup 1971/72 Results at Footballsite
 MOTD listings
 ITV regional listings & Midweek games for both BBC & ITV 
Specific

 
FA Cup seasons
Fa
Eng